Arkitektfirmaet C. F. Møller, internationally also known as C. F. Møller Architects, is an architectural firm based in Århus, Denmark. Founded in 1924 by C. F. Møller, it is today the largest architectural firm in Denmark based on number of employed architects. About half the revenue is earned outside Denmark. Besides the main office in Århus, the firm has offices in Copenhagen, Oslo, London and in 2007 it bought the Stockholm-based Swedish architectural practice Berg Arkitekter which is still operated under its own name.

Current projects include the largest hospital project ever to be built in Denmark in Århus, an extension of the National Maritime Museum in London and several highrise projects in Norway, Sweden and Denmark. C. F. Møller is also one of the 15 architecture practices that collaborated in the overall design of the Olympic Village for the 2012 Summer Olympics in London.

Selected works

Completed
 Aarhus University, Aarhus, Denmark (first stage completed 1933)
 National Gallery extension, Copenhagen, Denmark (completed 1998)
Field's Shopping Centre, Copenhagen (completed 2004)
 Bislett Stadium, Oslo, Norway (completed 2005)
 A. P. Møller School, Schleswig (Danish: Slesvig), Germany (completed 2008)
 Royal Academy of Music in Aarhus, an extension to the Aarhus Concert Hall, DK (completed 2007)
 Darwin Centre II, Natural History Museum, London, United Kingdom (completed 2008)
 New Ahus, Akershus University Hospital, Oslo, Norway (completed 2008)
Copenhagen International School, Copenhagen, Denmark (completed 2016)
 Vitus Bering Innovation Park, Horsens, Denmark (2009)
 Emergency and infectious diseases unit, MAS University Hospital, Malmö (2010)
 Queen Ingrid's Hospital extension, Nuuk, Greenland (2011)
 Sogn & Fjordane Art Museum, Fjorde, Norway (2012)
 Sammy Ofer wing, National Maritime Museum, London, United Kingdom (2009–2011)

In progress

 Point Hylie, Malmö, Sweden (competition win 2006, U/C, completion 2011)
 Aarhus University Hospital extension, Århus, DK (competition win 2007)
 Plot MO116, Greenwich, UK (competition win 2007)
 Art museum and offices, Førde, Norway (competition win)
 Alvik Tower, Stockholm, Sweden (competition win 2009)
  National Diabetes Centre, King Khalid University Hospital, Riyadh, Saudi Arabia (commission 2009)
 Crystal Clear highrise, Oslo, Norway (competition win 2009)
 Kristiansund Opera and Culture Center, Kristiansund, Norway (competition win 2010)
 Panum Institute extension, University of Copenhagen, Copenhagen (competition win 2010)
 New state prison, Falster, Denmark (competition win 2919)
 Greenwich CHP energy centre, London (due for completion in 2016).

Awards

 2006 Nykredit Architecture Prize
 2009 Building Better Healthcare Award for Akershus Hospital, London
 2009 Concrete Society Awards for Excellence - Overall Winner for Darwin Centre Phase Two, London
 2010 RIBA European Award for A. P. Møller School
 2010 Worldwide Brick Award for A. P. Møller School, London
 2010 WAN Award for The Sil(o)houette (residential category)
 2011 Civic Trust Award for Darwin Centre Phase Two
 2012 Civic Trust Award for Hospice Djursland
 2014 Civic Trust Awards for ''Aalborg Waterfront

See also
 Architecture of Denmark
 List of Danish architectural firms

References

External links

 Official site

Architecture firms of Denmark
Companies based in Aarhus
Danish companies established in 1922
Design companies established in 1924